The Moses and Ida Kline House is a house located in southwest Portland, Oregon, that is listed on the National Register of Historic Places.

See also
 National Register of Historic Places listings in Southwest Portland, Oregon

References

Houses on the National Register of Historic Places in Portland, Oregon
Houses completed in 1909
1909 establishments in Oregon
Bungalow architecture in Oregon
Southwest Hills, Portland, Oregon